Dinesh Agrawal is an Indian politician from Uttarakhand and a three term member of the Uttarakhand Legislative Assembly. Agrawal represents the Dharampur (Uttarakhand Assembly constituency). Agrawal is a member of the Indian National Congress and a senior leader in Congress.

Elections contested

Uttar Pradesh Legislative Assembly

Uttarakhand Legislative Assembly

Dehradun Municipal Corporation

References
 2007 Election
 2012 Election
 2017 Election

Living people
20th-century Indian politicians
Indian National Congress politicians from Uttarakhand
Uttarakhand politicians
Year of birth missing (living people)